George Charles Pratt, 2nd Marquess Camden, KG (2 May 1799 – 6 August 1866) was a British peer and Tory politician, styled Viscount Bayham from 1794 to 1812 and Earl of Brecknock in 1812–1840.

Pratt's father was John Pratt, Viscount Bayham, eldest son of Charles Pratt, 1st Earl Camden. His mother was Frances Molesworth, daughter of William Molesworth of Wembury, Devon (the second son of Sir John Molesworth, 4th Baronet).

In 1821, Brecknock became Tory Member of Parliament for Ludgershall, then for Bath in 1830 and finally for Dunwich in 1831. He was also a Lord of the Admiralty from 1828 to 1829.

On 8 January 1835, he was called to the House of Lords in his father's barony of Camden and was married later that year, on 27 August, to Harriet Murray (1813–1854), the daughter of George Murray, Bishop of Rochester. His wife was later made a Lady of the Bedchamber and they had eleven children.

In 1840, Camden inherited his father's titles. He was appointed a Knight of the Garter in 1846 and Lord Lieutenant of Brecknockshire in 1865.

He died at his country seat, Bayham Abbey, near Tunbridge Wells on 6 August 1866, having a few days earlier presided at the annual meeting of the Kent Archaeological Society at Ashford. His titles passed to his eldest son, John, Earl of Brecknock.

Sources
 Cokayne et al., The Complete Peerage

References

External links 
 

1799 births
1866 deaths
Knights of the Garter
Lord-Lieutenants of Brecknockshire
Lords of the Admiralty
Brecknock, George Pratt, Earl of
Brecknock, George Pratt, Earl of
Brecknock, George Pratt, Earl of
Brecknock, George Pratt, Earl of
UK MPs who inherited peerages
George
2